Angel Nafis (born December 1988) is an American poet and spoken word artist. She is the author of BlackGirl Mansion (Red Beard Press / New School Poetics, 2012). She lives in Brooklyn, New York.

Early life 
Nafis grew up in Ann Arbor, Michigan, where she attended Huron High School. She struggled through school, but graduated in 2006. She was on the Ann Arbor Youth Poetry Slam Team in 2005 and 2006.

She was raised Muslim. Her mother died when she was young, so she was raised by her father. Her father's family was from New York and Georgia. Her mother's family was from Chicago and Mississippi.

Education 
Nafis earned her BA at Hunter College, and is an MFA candidate in poetry at Warren Wilson College.

Career 

Nafis is a Cave Canem fellow, the recipient of a Millay Colony residency, and the founder and curator of the Greenlight Bookstore Poetry Salon's readings and writing workshops.

With poet Morgan Parker, she runs The Other Black Girl Collective, a Black feminist poetry duo that tours internationally.

Her work has appeared in outlets including the BreakBeat Poets Anthology, Buzzfeed Reader, the Rumpus, Poetry, FOUND Magazine’s Requiem for a Paper Bag, Decibels, The Rattling Wall, Union Station Magazine, The Bear River Review, MUZZLE Magazine, Prelude Mag, Sixth Finch, and Mosaic Magazine.

Personal life 
Nafis lives in Brooklyn with artist, writer, and musician Shira Erlichman, with whom she is in a relationship. Together, they toured for the "Odes for You" tour.

In June 2020, Nafis and hundreds of other poets signed an open letter to the Poetry Foundation asking for the immediate resignation of both president Henry Bienen and board of trustees chair Willard Bunn III, as well as other demands relating to the foundation's response to the murder of George Floyd.

Awards and honors 

 Ruth Lilly and Dorothy Sargent Rosenberg Poetry Fellowship from the Poetry Foundation (2016)
 NEA Creative Writing fellowship

Bibliography

Books 
 BlackGirl Mansion (Red Beard Press/ New School Poetics, 2012).

Selected list of published poems

References 

Poets from Michigan
Writers from Ann Arbor, Michigan
African-American poets
Hunter College alumni
LGBT African Americans
1988 births
Living people
Writers from Brooklyn
American LGBT poets
Slam poets
21st-century American poets
American spoken word artists
African-American educators
LGBT people from Michigan
LGBT women
21st-century African-American women writers
21st-century American women writers
21st-century African-American writers
African-American feminists
LGBT feminists
American feminist writers
American Muslims
Muslim poets
African-American Muslims
LGBT Muslims
African-American women musicians
20th-century African-American people
21st-century LGBT people
20th-century African-American women